Rawalpindi District (Punjabi and ) is a district located in the northernmost part of the Punjab province of Pakistan. Parts of the district form part of the Islamabad Rawalpindi metropolitan area. Rawalpindi city is the district capital.

It is situated on the southern slopes of the north-western extremities of the Himalayas, including large mountain tracts with rich valleys traversed by mountain rivers. The chief rivers are the Indus and the Jhelum, and it is noted for its milder climate and abundant rainfall due to its proximity to the foothills.

History

Ancient history

In ancient times the whole or the greater part of the area between the Indus and the Jhelum seems to have belonged to a Naga tribe called Takshakas, who gave their name to the city of Takshasila. Known as Taxila by the Greek historians, the location of the ancient city has been identified to be in the ruins of Shahdheri in the north-west corner of the District. At the time of Alexander's invasion Taxila was described by Arrian as a flourishing city, the greatest indeed between the Indus and the Hydaspes; Strabo adds that the neighbouring country was crowded with inhabitants and very fertile; and Pliny speaks of it as a famous city situated in a district called Amanda. The invasion of Demetrius in 195 B.C. brought the Punjab under the Graeco-Bactrian kings. Later they were superseded by the Sakas, who ruled at Taxila with the title of Satrap. At the time of Hiuen Tsiang the country was a dependency of Kashmir.

Mughal era
Sultan Mahmud Ghaznavi  passed through the District after his defeat of Anand Pal and capture of Ohind. The Gakhars, a tribe still of importance within the district trace their origins back to Mahmud of Ghanzi. The first mention of the Gakhars occurs in the memoirs of Babar, who gives an interesting account of the capture of their capital, Paralah. It was strongly situated in the hills, and was defended with great bravery by its chief Hati Khan, who escaped from one gate as the Mughal army marched in at the other. Hati Khan died by poison in 1525 ; his cousin and murderer Sultan Sarang then submitted to Babar, who conferred on him the area of Potwar. From that time on the Gakhar chieftains remained firm allies of the Mughal dynasty, and provided significant aid to the Mughal in their struggle against the house of Sher Shah. Salim Shah attempted in vain to subdue their country.

In 1553 Adam Khan, Sarang's successor, surrendered the rebel prince Kamran to Humayun. Adam Khan was subsequently deposed by Akbar, and his principality given over to his nephew Kamal Khan. During the height of the Mughal empire, the family of Sarang retained its territorial possessions. Its last and Gakhars chief, Mukarrab Khan, ruled over a kingdom which extended from the Chenab to the Indus.

British era
In 1849 Rawalpindi passed with the rest of the Sikh dominions under British rule; and though tranquillity was disturbed by an insurrection four years later, led by a Gakhar chief with the object of placing a pretended son of Ranjit Singh on the throne, its administration was generally peaceful until the outbreak of the Mutiny in 1857.
The Dhunds and other tribes of the Murree Hills, incited by Hindustani agents, rose in insurrection, and the authorities received information from a faithful native of a projected attack upon the station of Murree in time to organise measures for defence. The women near the station, who were present in large numbers, were placed in safety, while the Europeans and police were drawn up in a cordon round the station. The rebels arrived expecting no resistance, but were met with organised resistance and were repelled.

The district of Rawalpindi was created during British rule as part of Punjab province. The district obtained its current boundaries in 1904 when Attock District was created as a separate district. According to the 1901 census of India the population in 1901 was 558,699, an increase of 4.7% from 1891. During the period of British rule, Rawalpindi district increased in population and importance.

Administrative division
Rawalpindi district is governed by the Rawalpindi District Council, while several regions sub-divided into one Municipal Corporation, two Cantonment Boards and Seven tehsils:

 Rawalpindi Metropolitan Corporation
 Rawalpindi Cantonment Board
 Chaklala Cantonment Board

Demography 

In 2017 population of Rawalpindi district was 5,402,380. 2,736,180 were male and 2,665,089 were female. 2,396,672 (44.36%) lived in rural areas and 3,005,708 (55.64%) lived in urban areas. 

According to the 1998 census of Pakistan, the population of the district was 3,363,911 of which 53.03% were urban, and is the second-most urbanised district in Punjab. The population was estimated to be 4.5 million in 2010.

Religion 
According to the 2017 census Muslims were the overwhelming majority religion with 98.01%, while Christians were 1.90% of the population.

Language 
At the time of the 1998 census of Pakistan, the following were the demographics of the Rawalpindi district, by first language:
 Punjabi: %
 Urdu: 3.5%
 Pashto: 4.3%
 Others: approx. 2.2%

At the time of the 2017 Census of Pakistan, the distribution of the population of Rawalpindi District by first language was as follows:
 68.7% Punjabi
 10.9% Pashto
 10.2% Urdu
 3.2% Hindko
 1.8% Kashmiri
 1.0% Saraiki
 0.2% Sindhi
 0.1% Brahui
 0.1% Balochi
 4.0% Others

Education
According to the 2015 census, Rawalpindi was ranked number one district of Pakistan in terms of education and school infrastructure facilities. According to official 2014 Public Schools Census data, district Rawalpindi had a total of 1,230 primary, 316 middle, 365 secondary and 40 higher secondary schools. Out of these public sector schools, 911 are male schools while 1,040 are for girls. There were 4,279 teachers teaching at primary level while 3,129, 6,516 and 1,155 teachers are teaching at middle, secondary and higher secondary level, respectively. Out of these teachers, 9,788 are female while 5,291 are male. 24% of the Class 2 students could not read a story in Urdu, 26% could not read a sentence in English and 46% of Class 5 students could not do two digit divisions. 8% of the students dropped out of the school at the primary level.

Agriculture
The principal crops were wheat, barley, maize, millets, and pulses. The district was traversed by the main line of the North-Western railway, crossing the Indus at Attock and also by a branch towards the Indus at Kushalgarh.

Notable people

Syed Asim Munir Ahmed Shah Current Chief of the Army Staff (COAS), Pakistan Army
Raja Zafar-ul-Haq, Chairman PML N (Political Party), Opposition Leader in Senate, Former Leader of house in Senate, Former Federal Minister, Former Ambassador.
Shahid Khaqan Abbasi, ex Prime Minister of Pakistan
Khaqan Abbasi, ex. Federal Minister for Production
Raja Ashfaq Sarwar, ex. Minister Punjab
Raja Pervaiz Ashraf, ex Prime Minister of Pakistan
Gen. Ashfaq Pervez Kayani, ex Chief of the Army Staff (2007–2013)
Gen. Tikka Khan, ex Chief of the Army Staff (1972–1976), Governor of East Pakistan (1971), Governor of Punjab (1988–1990)
Chaudhry Nisar Ali Khan, ex Interior minister of Pakistan.
Sheikh Rashid Ahmad, MNA, Former Minister for Interior of Pakistan
Shoaib Akhtar, former Pakistan Cricket Team player and World's Fastest Bowler
Wajid Zia, Director General of the Federal Investigation Agency
Sohail Tanvir, Pakistan Cricket Team player
Gen. Zaheerul Islam, director general of the Inter-Services Intelligence of Pakistan
Muhammad Mahfuz, Nishan-e-Haider (Highest Military Award)
Bilquis Sheikh, Pakistani author
Rohail Hyatt, Pakistani record producer, keyboardist, and composer.
Swaran Lata (actress), Pakistani film actress
Azhar Mahmood, Cricketer
Yasir Arafat Satti, Cricketer
Najaf Shah, Cricketer
Umar Amin, Cricketer
Raja Muhammad Sarwar, Nishan-e-Haider (Highest Military Award)
Amir Khan (boxer), Boxer
Mohammad Amir, Cricketer
Sawar Muhammad Hussain Shaheed, Nishan-e-Haider (Highest Military Award)
Khan Ghulam Sarwar Khan, Politician from Taxila, Former Federal Minister
Mohammad Wasim, Cricketer
Mohammad Akram, Cricketer
Sawar Khan, Ex Vice Chief of the Army Staff
Abdul Aziz Mirza, Chief of Naval Staff, ambassador to Saudi Arabia.
Dada Amir Haider Khan - Communist leader of undivided India and later Pakistan
Lt. Col (R) Muhammad Shabbir Awan, ex MPA PP2 Punjab Assembly Col Shabbir Awan joined PTI on 19 December 2013
Tara Singh, Sikh Activist

References

 
Districts of Punjab, Pakistan